Sosnogorsk (Sösnagort) is a town in the Komi Republic, Russia, located on the Izhma River. Population:

History
The settlement was first established in 1939 as a railway station. It was known as Izhma until 1957. During the Soviet era, a corrective labor camp was located here. Gas giant Gazprom has a natural-gas condensate factory in the town.

Administrative and municipal status
Within the framework of administrative divisions, the town of Sosnogorsk is, together with two urban-type settlement administrative territories (comprising the urban-type settlements of Voyvozh and Nizhny Odes and three rural localities) and thirteen rural localities, incorporated as the town of republic significance of Sosnogorsk—an administrative unit with the status equal to that of the districts. As a municipal division, the town of republic significance of Sosnogorsk is incorporated as Sosnogorsk Municipal District; the town of Sosnogorsk and thirteen rural localities are incorporated within it as Sosnogorsk Urban Settlement. The two urban-type settlement administrative territories are incorporated into two urban settlements within the municipal district.

References

Notes

Sources

External links
Official website of Sosnogorsk
Sosnogorsk news 

Cities and towns in the Komi Republic
Ust-Sysolsky Uyezd